The New Haven Battlefield is the area of American Civil War military engagements at the intersection of the Rolling Fork and the former Louisville and Nashville Railroad line between Knoxville and New Haven, Kentucky. The geographic area includes the James Howell Farm ("New Haven Battlefield Site" on the National Register of Historic Places) and additional combat areas of December 30, 1862.

James Howell Farm
The James Howell Farm established in 1830 was expanded in the 1840s and late 1850s. On one side of the property, the Louisville and Nashville Railroad established Knoxville branch tracks (now owned by the Kentucky Railway Museum) with a station at New Haven.  After the Skirmish at New Haven and the end of the Civil War, roads on the property were cut through the path in the nineteenth century; in the twentieth they became farm roads, and eventually ceased to exist altogether, with only what is now Kentucky State Route 52 still remaining.

Fort Allen

The stockade was designed to hold a single infantry company. The regimental staff arrived in November 1862 and a smaller headquarters stockade and a stable for their horses were added.

After the successful defense of Fort Allen defense during the skirmish there, the 78th Illinois was transferred south in January 1863 and was replaced at the fort by the 63rd Indiana Infantry. The 63rd Indiana Infantry was transferred to Camp Nelson in January 1864 and was replaced by the 33rd Kentucky Infantry, whose commander, Cyrus J. Wilson, was Fort Allen's last commander. After the fort was abandoned in April 1864, the fort's military buildings were burned on September 19, 1864, by guerrilla Henry C. Magruder; who was captured by Wilson in April 1865 and hanged after recovering from being shot.

Skirmish at New Haven
During Morgan's Christmas Raid in 1862, three companies of the 9th Kentucky Cavalry arrived near New Haven late on December 29 to destroy the Rolling Fork railroad bridge. The next morning New Haven native Captain Henry P. Housley delivered the Confederate surrender demand to Fort Allen. The fort's commander Colonel William H. Benneson of the 78th Illinois Infantry refused despite frequent surrenders when the Raid had used artillery to previously challenge Union infantry forts. The gun's untrained crew of detailed cavalrymen neglected to adjust the elevation and maneuvered to place the gun closer. Consequently, they overshot the fort and the town's New Haven House and Mansion House (taverns/hotels) were damaged by shells. Confederate mounted riflemen with Pattern 1853 Enfield rifle-muskets dismounted in a firing line, and when they closed to within  of the fort, received fire from Union .69 caliber muzzle-loading rifles. After a 90-minute skirmish, the Confederate force withdrew with the howitzer and one confirmed wounded. The Union suffered no casualties and the howitzer did not damage the fort.

See also
 List of battles fought in Kentucky

References

American Civil War forts
Battlefields of the Western Theater of the American Civil War
Forts on the National Register of Historic Places in Kentucky
Farms on the National Register of Historic Places in Kentucky
Conflict sites on the National Register of Historic Places in Kentucky
American Civil War on the National Register of Historic Places
Kentucky in the American Civil War
Tourist attractions in LaRue County, Kentucky
National Register of Historic Places in LaRue County, Kentucky
Louisville and Nashville Railroad